The 1983–84 Indiana Hoosiers men's basketball team represented Indiana University. Their head coach was Bobby Knight, who was in his 13th year. The team played its home games in Assembly Hall in Bloomington, Indiana, and was a member of the Big Ten Conference.

The Hoosiers finished the regular season with an overall record of 22–9 and a conference record of 13–5, finishing 3rd in the Big Ten Conference. IU was invited to participate in the 1984 NCAA Tournament as a 4-seed. On their way to the Elite Eight, IU beat 12-seed Richmond and 1-seed North Carolina. The Hoosiers eventually lost to 7-seed Virginia in the Elite Eight.

Roster

Schedule/Results

|-
!colspan=8| Regular Season
|-

|-
!colspan=8| NCAA tournament

References

Indiana Hoosiers men's basketball seasons
Indiana
Indiana
1983 in sports in Indiana
1984 in sports in Indiana